Hermosillo, formerly called Pitic (as in Santísima Trinidad del Pitic and Presidio del Pitic), is a city located in the center of the northwestern Mexican state of Sonora. It is the municipal seat of the Hermosillo municipality, the state's capital and largest city, as well as the primary economic center for the state and the region. As of 2020, the city has a population of 936,263, making it the 18th largest city in Mexico. The recent increase in the city's population is due to expanded industrialization, especially within the automotive industry.

Hermosillo was ranked as one of the five best cities to live in, in Mexico, as published in the study "The Most Livable Cities of Mexico 2013" by the Strategic Communications Cabinet of the Mexican Federal Government. Hermosillo was also ranked in 2016 as the seventh most competitive city in the country according to the Mexican Institute for Competitiveness (IMCO), based on factors such as its economic diversification, geographical location, access to education, government, innovation and international relations. The major manufacturing sector has been the production of automobiles since the 1980s.

Hermosillo has a subtropical hot desert climate (BWh).

History

Evidence from a site called the San Dieguito Complex, located in the El Pinacate Zone, suggests the area has been inhabited by humans for about 3,000 years. Evidence of agriculture dates back 2,500 years. In the pre-Hispanic era, this area was inhabited by the historic Seri, Tepoca, and Pima peoples.

The first encounter between the Spanish and the indigenous peoples of the area occurred in the middle of the 16th century, when European explorers came in search of gold. The Spanish explorers were followed by their Franciscan missionaries in the state of Sonora around 1614.  Eusebio Francisco Kino arrived in 1687, founding a mission in nearby Cucurpe. The present-day states of Sonora and Sinaloa were loosely organized as the provinces of Sonora, Ostimura and Sinaloa.

In 1700, three small Spanish villages were founded in what is now the outskirts of Hermosillo: Nuestra Señora del Pópulo, Nuestra Señora de Los Angeles, and la Santísima Trinidad del Pitic. The native peoples here soon became hostile to the colonists and repeatedly drove them out in the early 18th century. In 1716, the Spanish offered irrigated lands for farmers to the native peoples, who agreed to abide by Spanish law. Around 1726, a fort named the Presidio of Pitic was constructed to stop the domination of this area by the natives, especially the Seri. However, the situation remained contentious. The first church was not built until 1787, and the first formal parish was not established until 1822.

During the Mexican War of Independence, Sonora and the town of Pitic stayed loyal to the Spanish Crown. Local general Alejo García Conde defeated insurgent José María González Hermosillo, who had been sent by Miguel Hidalgo y Costilla. Following independence from Spain, in 1825 the village of Pitic was made the seat of the department of the same name. In 1828, the settlement changed its name to Hermosillo to honor the insurgent leader José María González de Hermosillo.

A battle between imperial and republican forces occurred here in 1866 during the French Intervention in Mexico. In 1879, the capital of the state of Sonora was moved from Arizpe to Hermosillo. In 1881 the railroad linking Hermosillo with Guaymas and Nogales was finished, allowing for economic expansion in the area by bringing in mining equipment and modern agricultural equipment. Since then, the city has been an economic center for northwest Mexico.

During the Mexican Revolution, beginning in 1910, forces loyal to Pancho Villa were expelled from the city by General Manuel M. Diéguez. After the assassination of Francisco I. Madero in 1913, Venustiano Carranza, then governor of Coahuila, sought refuge in Hermosillo. Here, Carranza began the Constitutionalist Movement. As a result, Hermosillo is nicknamed the "revolutionary capital of the country."

From the late 19th century, until around 1920, Chinese immigrants entered the state of Sonora as laborers. A significant number settled in the city of Hermosillo. Some of these immigrants established businesses, especially shoe manufacturing and clothing. Some of the most successful Chinese-owned businesses in Sonora were based in Hermosillo, and sold their merchandise to other parts of the country. But by the 1920s, anti-Chinese sentiment had become strong in Sonora state, and many Chinese left for Mexico City or the United States.

In the 1980s, Ford Motor Company built a plant. This strongly influenced the city and state economy.

Hermosillo was the tragic site of a fire, at the ABC Child Care Center, on June 5, 2009. According to the Procuraduría General de Justicia en el Estado (State Attorney General Office) de Sonora, the fire resulted in 49 deaths at the center; nearly half of them were children. The fire is believed to have started at an adjacent automobile shop, before spreading to the child care center. Most of the children died of asphyxiation. There were about a hundred children inside the building. Firefighters had to smash holes in the walls to rescue the children, who ranged in age from six months to five years.

Origins 
The origin of Hermosillo dates to the 1700s, when the mission villages of Our Lady of The Pup, Our Lady of Angels, and the Holy Trinity of Pitic were founded. They collected members of the Yaqui, Seri, Tepoca, and Pima Bajo peoples.

Years earlier, internal difficulties had occurred between the Tepoca and the Bajo Pima peoples. The Spanish wanted to bring them into the mission villages to have more control over their work.  

The villages and city were intended to contain the Seri and Tepoca Indians, to protect the Hispanic expansion. It was called the Real Presidio de San Pedro de la Conquista, named after Viceroy Don Pedro de Castro y Figueroa, Duke of the Conquest and Marquis of Grace. The explorer in charge of the foundation of the peoples was John the Baptist of Escalante, who pacified tensions. 

On May 18, 1700, he gave a speech that was documented, in part: 
"Sending them to have no wars from now on, but to live as Christians and to deal with each other with fairs of the clothes of their use and seeds of their plantings, to which they responded from one and the other, which they would do thank ingsands thank ing best for the good that they made peace of way."

In 1718, on the orders of Governor Manuel de San Juan y Santa Cruz, the town of the Holy Trinity of Pitic was repopulated; on September 29, 1725 the Seri settled in the Pópulo rose in the son of war and invaded the people of Opodepe. The Seri were persecuted for the purpose of punishing them until they signed the peace in January 1726, and they were settled in the Porplo and in the points called Alares and Moraga; subsequently given the uncertainty due to the bellicoseness of the indigenous, the Pitic presidio was formed.

Presidio of Saint Peter of the Conquest of the Pitic
In June 1741, Don Agustin of Vildósola established the presidio of St. Peter of the Conquest of the Pitic.
Nine years later, the troops of the Pupium were transferred to El Pópulo, in the present municipality of San Miguel de Horcasitas. As a result of this action, Pitic was left in a very precarious situation, because numerous residents emigrated for fear of the Seri.

While the Presidio's settlement was about to disappear, senior authorities ordered a group of soldiers to remain on site to ensure the safety of the settlers. In 1772, the mayor Pedro de Corbalán ordered the construction of a canal on the left bank of the Rio Sonora, to irrigate the lands and orchards.

Pitic's Villa .A.
Before the end of the eighteenth century the former Presidio of San Pedro de la Conquista del Pitic became Villa del Pitic.

On February 9, 1825, the Villa del Pitic was established as the head of the party, dependent on the department of Horcasitas. This coincided with the urbanization that the royal surveyors gave it, as it progressed steadily.

In 1827, the city had approximately eight thousand inhabitants, and its urbanization was very particular, as the houses were scattered in all directions. The region was fertile, well-cultivated and provided an abundance of what was necessary for life and even many luxuries. Already then it was, very cheap, high quality beef that to this day is famous.

The Village of Hermosillo
On September 5, 1828, by decree no. 77 of the H. Legislature of the State of the West, the name Villa del Pitic was deleted and the name of the City of Hermosillo was imposed, in honor of the general Jalisco-jalisciense José María González de Hermosillo who in the late 1810 had carried the task of the national insurrection to lands Sinaloa-Sinaloenses, then part of the Western State as well.

On March 12, 1831, the State of Sonora was founded and Hermosillo was its first capital from 14 May of that year to May 25, 1832, when the capital powers were transferred to the city of Arizpe. In 1837, the city was erected at the head of the district of its name. At the same date, Don Pascual Iñigo began the construction of the Chapel of Our Lady of Carmen.

He also points out that on October 14, 1852, in the city, a section of filibusters under the command of Gastón de Raousset-Boulbon faced and defeated the national forces, who were under the leadership of General Miguel Blanco de Estrada; this as part of a revolutionary campaign of independence that was intended to turn Sonora and Lower California into colonial territories France However, Raousset remained only a few days in the city, choosing to go to Guaymas to continue his campaign where he would eventually be defeated by General José María Yáñez Carrillo in [Battle of Guaymas] (1854).

On May 4, 1866, under Second Mexican Empire of Maximilian of Habsburg, the republican troops commanded by the general  attacked and seized the city, which was defended by Second Mexican Empire, under Colonel María Tranquilino Almada. However, a few hours later, it fell back into the hands of the forces of the empire. On November 13, 1866, General Martinez again took the city again in blood and fire, causing the imperialists to flee, who regained it eight days later.

In 1879 Hermosillo was once again the headquarters of state powers, thanks to the management of the acting governor Don Francisco Serna, at least on an interim date. However, when the new Political Constitution of the State of Sonora was issued on September 15, 1917, it was definitively confirmed that the city of Hermosillo is the headquarters of the state powers, as referred to in article 28 thereof.

On November 4 in front of the wooden station of Sonora dozens of people gathered at the opening of the Guaymas-Hermosillo railway section. On the train came Don Carlos Rodrigo Ortiz Retes, accompanied by the commander of the Military Zone, brigadier Colonel José Guillermo Carbó. Months later, the cargo and passenger service would be established between Guaymas and the Nogales (Sonora)' Noals.

20th century

At the beginning of the 20th century, Hermosillo had about 14,000 inhabitants. During the Mexican Revolution, forces loyal to Francisco 'Pancho' Villa were expelled from the city by the General Manuel M. Diéguez. After the assassination of Francisco I. Madero in 1913, Venustiano Carranza, then governor of Coahuila sought refuge in Hermosillo. Here Carranza began the Constitutionalist Movement, because of this, Hermosillo has the nickname "the revolutionary capital of the country'".

In the late 19th century and the first two decades of the 20th century, Chinese immigrants arrived in Sonora. One of the settlements with a significant number was the city of Hermosillo. Some of these immigrants had money and used it to set up businesses, especially shoe and clothing manufacturing. Some of the most successful businesses with Chinese owners in Sonora were in Hermosillo and sold merchandise to other parts of the country. However, in the [20years] a sentiment against the Chinese population in Sonora was strengthened, resulting in many fleeing to Mexico City or the United States.

In the 1980s, Ford built Hermosillo Stamping & Assembly in the city, which had a major impact on the city's economy and that of the state. A whole chain of suppliers was also developed around the assembly plant, which further contributed to economic growth in Hermosillo. Hermosillo was selected partly due to its proximity to the United States.http://s3.amazonaws.com/zanran_storage/www.gerpisa.univ-evry.fr/ContentPages/44177382.pdf 

21st century

In 2000, the businessman Pancho Búrquez was elected as municipal president for National Action Party, in that triennium, the municipality won national awards (such as that of the Secretariat of Comptroller ship and Administrative Development of the federal government, as well as of the International City/County Management Association as one of the most transparent cities in the world. Investment grew in the early decade thanks to the ease of doing business.

One of the most important events in Hermosillo was the event of the ABC Nursery Fire on June 5, 2009. According to the Attorney General's Office of the State of Sonora, there were 49 deaths in the ABC nursery fire. The fire apparently began in a warehouse with government documents planning to disappear, then expanded to daycare. Most of the children died of asphyxiation. There were about 100 children inside the building, firefighters and the population had to make holes in the walls to rescue the children, ranging from six months to five years. surname a stir both nationally and internationally and society's demand for justice. As a result of these events, June 3, 2010 was published in the Official Journal of the Federation the [decree] by which Day of national mourning is declared on June 5, for the tragedy that occurred at the "ABC Nursery, Civil Society" in Hermosillo, Sonora, on June 5, 2009 and "In sign of national mourning, the izamient is agreed or the National Flag at half-mast on June 5 of each year. parents of victims and citizen organizations, Year-by-year they are reminded by releasing pink and blue balloons on behalf of the nursery children from the tragedy was thoroughly amended by the General Law on Provision of Services for Child Care, Care and Integral Child Development, a legal framework that regulates the operation of nurseries at the national level. It was published in the [Official Journal of the Federation], on October 27, 2011.

Geography

The two most important rivers are the Sonora and the San Miguel. Both of these are used for irrigation purposes with the Abelardo L. Rodriguez Dam located on the San Miguel River. The population increase of the municipality, currently at 2.5% annually, puts pressure on the infrastructure of the city, especially its water supply. Decades of overpumping of ground water has led to the aquifer levels being lower than sea levels, and sea water creeping in as an "artificial recharge."

Climate and ecology
Under the Köppen climate classification, Hermosillo features a borderline hot arid (BWh)/hot semi-arid (BSh) climate.

Most of the regional flora consists of mesquite trees, with an added mixture of blue agave, desert ironwood, palo verde and the huisache. Native fauna includes the desert tortoise, several species of rattlesnake and kingsnake, mule deer (locally called ‘coues’ deer), collared peccary, ringtail, ocelot, puma, desert bighorn sheep, opossum, raccoon, coyote, and bobcat. Black bear may be observed on occasion, on the fringes of settled areas. In August of 2022, the once-common jaguar was finally witnessed in the Hermosillo area. Locals nicknamed the lone male “El Jefe”, meaning “boss”. The critically endangered Sonoran pronghorn antelope was once common in the area; less than 200 are thought to exist today, with an additional -200 (declining) surviving in the U.S. state of Arizona. Populations of feral red-masked parakeets and monk parakeets are a local sightseeing attraction here.

Demographics

According to the results of INEGI, Hermosillo is Mexico's 16th largest city, with 812,229 people. Other important communities in the municipality include Miguel Alemán (30,869), Bahía Kino (6,050), San Pedro el Saucito (2,938), El Tazajal (2,062), La Victoria (1,966), Zamora (1,049), and Mesa Del Seri (908). The recent city population spur is due to its recent strong industrialization, especially in the automotive industry and its providers.

Economy

Most of the municipality's population lives in the city proper, with most jobs located in the manufacturing and commerce sectors here. About 250,000 hectares are under cultivation in the city's outskirts, most of which is near the coast. Crops include wheat, grapes, flowers, chickpeas, alfalfa and walnuts. Livestock has been traditionally important here, especially beef cattle. Pigs, sheep, goats, horses, domestic fowl and bees are also raised here as well. Fishing is practiced along the coast with shrimp being the most important catch.

Industry and manufacturing has been the most dynamic sector of the economy. Much of this began in the 1980s with the establishment of the automobile industry, specifically the Hermosillo Stamping & Assembly plant owned and operated by Ford Motor Company. Electronics and IT are the largest employers by both revenue and number of employees. Today, there are twenty-six major manufacturers, which generate about 68,300 jobs, employing about thirty percent of the population.

Other than cars, products manufactured here include televisions, computers, food processing, textiles, wood products, printing, cellular phones, chemicals, petroleum products and plastics. Lanix electronics has a major research and design facility and its main manufacturing plant in Hermosillo. The city and its municipality have twelve industrial parks, which house over one hundred smaller manufacturing enterprises. There has been slowing of this sector especially the automobile industry because of the global economic downturn that began in 2008.

Commerce employs more than half of the population; besides small local businesses, chains are well represented; these are locally, regionally (Northwest Mexico), nationally, and U.S.-based. Tourism is mostly limited to the coastal communities of Bahia de Kino, Kino Nuevo and Punta Chueca, where there are cave paintings and a recreational park named La Sauceda.
In 2009, Standard & Poor's rated the municipality of Hermosillo as (mxA/Estable/-) based on its administrative practices, financial flexibility and limited financial risks. Financial management of the municipality has been prudent, with adequate documentation of practices. Debt levels have also been prudent at about 33% of gross income, which might decline in 2010. However, the municipality has limited liquid capital.

Sports
Baseball
The city has a professional baseball team called Naranjeros de Hermosillo (Orange Growers) that plays in the Estadio Sonora. Baseball has been popular in Hermosillo since the late 19th century. The club had its beginnings in the 1950s, when the Liga Invernal de Sonora (Sonora Winter League) was founded as a complement to the already existing Liga de la Costa del Pacífico (Pacific Coast League). The Naranjeros were officially organized in 1958. Since then, the team has won 16 championships in the Pacific Coast League and two championships in the Caribbean Series. Hermosillo hosted the 2013 Caribbean Series in February.

In 2021, Hermosillo and Ciudad Obregón co-hosted the 3rd U-23 Baseball World Cup, organized by the World Baseball Softball Confederation. In 2022, Hermosillo hosted the 5th U-15 Baseball World Cup.

 Basketball 
Founded in 2009, the Rayos de Hermosillo has been Hermosillo's professional basketball club. The Rayos play in the Circuito de Baloncesto de la Costa del Pacífico (CIBACOPA) and play their home games at the Gimnasio del Estado.

They have won three league titles (2012, 2013, 2019).

Football
Since 2013, the city has been home to Cimarrones de Sonora FC, an association football club who currently play in the Liga de Expansión MX, the second-tier of the Mexican football league system. Home matches are played at Estadio Héroe de Nacozari. The city is also home to the Soles de Sonora of Major Arena Soccer League.

Field hockey
In 2010, Hermosillo hosted the first Pan American Youth Championship boys' field hockey tournament.

 Education and health 

According to the 2010 population and housing census, in Hermosillo the literacy rate of people between 15 and 24 years old is 98.6% and that of people aged 25 or over is 97%.

School attendance for people aged 3 to 5 is 46.3%; from 6 to 11 years old it is 97.2%; from 12 to 14 years is 94.6% and from 15 to 24 years is 49.8%.

 Higher education institutions 

Hermosillo has several institutions of higher education, being the highest house of studies the Universidad de Sonora Hermosillo campus, with more than thirty thousand students in forty-six degrees and more than three thousand teachers.

There are also the Technological Institute of Hermosillo, the Monterrey Institute of Technology and Higher Education Sonora Norte campus, the Universidad del Valle de México, the State University of Sonora, the Technological University of Hermosillo, among others.

 Health 
Hermosillo is home to the most important public hospital in Sonora, the General Hospital of the State of Sonora; Also the Children's Hospital of the State of Sonora (HIES) and the Women's Integral Hospital of the State of Sonora (HIMES) where hundreds of children are received and treated and women as well as the Oncology Hospital in which patients referred from the previous three and from the rest of the state are treated for this type of care as well as multiple family medical units and general hospitals in the IMSS area, ISSSTE and ISSSTESON (the equivalent of ISSSTE but for workers in the Sonoran State service), Regional Military Hospital and not to mention that health in Hermosillo is going to the forefront with certified private hospitals such as CIMA Hospital and San José Hospital and private clinics such as: Noroeste Medical Center, San Benito Clinic, Licona Hospital and San Francisco Clinic among others. INEGI data report that in 2011 there were 482 medical units.

In Hermosillo, 76% of the population has access to some type of right of habitation. Of the entire population of the municipality, 47.5% have access to IMSS, 11% to Popular Insurance, 14.4% to ISSSTE, and 6.3% have another type of medical security.

Parks and recreation
Hermosillo is located on a plain in the Sonoran Desert, surrounded by grassy flat areas, beyond which are greener hills with serrated peaks in the distance. The city is a common stopover for North Americans traveling by car toward the coast, and is the only city in Mexico that purifies all drinking water before it goes to homes. The city is the major economic center for the state, with about thirty percent of the state's population living in the city.

The center of the city is Plaza Zaragoza, which was built in 1865 and has a Moorish-style gazebo which was brought from Florence, Italy in the early 20th century. It also has a flower garden and statues of General Ignacio Pesqueira and General García Morales.

The plaza is framed by the State Government Palace and the cathedral. The Palacio de Gobierno (Spanish for "Government Palace") was constructed in 1881 using stone from the nearby Cerro de la Campana mountain. It has a white Neoclassical facade, with the central portion extended slightly out from the rest of the building. This central part is flanked by Ionic columns and is topped by a semicircular pediment and a clock tower. To either side are windows on the first level and balconies on the second, with the corners having thick pilasters. The interior has a courtyard with a main staircase, decorated with murals depicting scenes from Sonora's history, painted in 1982–1984 by Teresa Moran, Enrique Estrada, and Héctor Martínez Arteche. The building was officially inaugurated in 1906 and reflects elements of French style, which was popular at the time.

The cathedral, named the Catedral de la Asunción, is located next to Plaza Zaragoza. It was begun in the 18th century but was not finished until the beginning of the 20th. However, the first chapels associated with the cathedral were begun in the 18th century. Construction of the cathedral began in 1861 and is a mix of predominantly Neoclassical architecture with Neogothic decorative elements. The main entrance is flanked by paired columns on pedestals and the smaller side doors are topped with semicircular pediments. Above the main doors are two ogival or pointed windows, over which is a crest with a balustrade. The church's towers have three levels with a dome-like top and are decorated with crosses from Caravaca de la Cruz. The interior of the church is of very austere Neoclassical design.

The Regional Museum was opened in 1960 with only one small hall, which exhibited archeological finds from the region. Today, there are two large halls, one dedicated to anthropology and the other to history. The anthropology hall displays archeological finds such as tools, utensils, textiles, stone objects and more from both the pre-Hispanic and colonial periods. The second focuses on the colonial period and contains items such as documents, maps, tools, coins and more.

The Museo de Sonora (Museum of Sonora) is housed in a building that originally functioned as a prison. It was completed in 1907 and built by the mostly indigenous prisoners themselves. The prison closed in 1979. In the 1980s, the building was reconditioned, reopening as the current museum in 1985. This museum has eighteen rooms covering various aspects of the state including its paleontology, history, archeology and ethnography. It has also conserved some of the cells of the original prison. Some of its more important items in the collection include a serpent's head from the Teotihuacan period, a collection of coins from the 16th century and various antique weapons.

The Museo de Culturas Populares e Indígenas de Sonora (Museum of Popular and Indigenous Cultures of Sonora) was the former residence of Dr. Alberto Hoeffer. It was constructed in 1904 and restored in 1997, conserving its original French-inspired style. Today, it houses a museum mostly dedicated to the indigenous cultures of the state, including crafts, clothing, customs and ways of life.

The Plaza Hidalgo area of the city was a very fashionable area during the first half of the 20th century when a number of the wealthy and influential of the city built homes here. Today, many of these constructions now house institutions such as the Instituto Sonorense de Cultura, the Colegio de Sonora, Radio Sonora, the Colegio Library and the Colegio de Notarios. Each weekend, the plaza becomes a cultural center, hosting various activities and events such as concerts, exhibitions, theatrical works and more.

The Cerro de la Campana mountain is one of the symbols of Hermosillo. There are two theories as to the origin of the mountain's name. One states that it is from a peculiar metallic sound that is made when the mountain's rocks fall against each other. The other is based on the bell-like shape of the elevation.

Just outside the city proper on the highway to Guaymas is the Centro Ecológico de Sonora (Ecological Center of Sonora). The center has more than 300 species of plants and 200 species of animals from both Sonora and other parts of the world. All of the animals live in recreated natural habitats. The Sonoran collection is part of one of CES's main functions, which is to preserve the flora and fauna of the state. The collection contains representations of animals and plants from the four main habitats of the state: mountains, grassland, desert and sea. Some of the species are in danger of extinction such as the bighorn sheep, the white-tailed deer as well as a number of bird and reptile species.

The Dr. Alfonso Ortiz Tirado Festival has been an annual event since 1985 and is the most important cultural event in northwest Mexico. It takes place in Hermosillo and a number of other municipalities in the state. Representatives from various Mexican states and countries such as Spain, the United States, Brazil, Germany and others send artists to perform and exhibit their work. The event is organized by the Sonoran state government and the Instituto Sonorense de Cultura.

In the Coloso neighborhood of Hermosillo, and other locations in Sonora, the Yaqui people are known for their celebrations of Holy Week, which mix Catholic and indigenous religious practices. In Hermosillo, the main brotherhood that sponsors this event is called the Fariseos. Rites performed during this week are intended to combat evil and sickness, calling upon both saints and "temastians" or medicine men to use magic to expel evil spirits. During this time participants dress in traditional Yaqui clothing and perform native dances such as El Coyote (The Coyote), Matachines, Los Pascolas and especially the Danza del Venado (Deer Dance), animal sacred to the Yaqui as a symbol of good.

Two other major festivals there include the Fiesta de la Vendimia (Grape Harvest Festival) in July and the Feria Exposición Ganadera e Industrial (Livestock and Industry Exposition and Fair) in May.

Education
Hermosillo has several public and private higher education institutions, among them:
 Universidad de Sonora
Tecnológico de Monterrey (ITESM), Campus Sonora Norte
 Universidad de Hermosillo
 Instituto Tecnológico de Hermosillo
 Universidad Tecnológica de Hermosillo (UTH)
 Instituto de Ciencias y Educación Superior
 Universidad del Valle de México (formerly Universidad del Noroeste)
 Universidad Kino
 Centro de Estudios Superiores del Estado de Sonora (CESUES)
 El Colegio de Sonora
 Universidad TecMilenio, Campus Hermosillo
 Centro de Investigación en Alimentos y Desarrollo (CIAD)
 Instituto de Capacitación para el Trabajo de Sonora (ICATSON)
 Colegio Nacional de Capacitación Intensiva (CNCI)
 Universidad del Desarrollo Profesional (UNIDEP)
 Escuela Normal del Estado "Profr. Jesús Manuel Bustamante Mungarro"
 Colegio Nacional de Educación Profesional Técnica (CONALEP)
 Colegio de Bachilleres del Estado de Sonora (COBACH)

Private primary and secondary schools include:
 Instituto Irlandés Hermosillo Colegio Bicultural Génesis 
Nuevos Horizontes

Nearby attractions
Bahía de Kino, known as Bahía Kino, and in English as Kino Bay, is on the coast of the municipality and named after Father Eusebio Kino. The waters of the bay have little wave action or undertow and are warm year-round. Activities practiced here include swimming, scuba diving, snorkeling, fishing a variety of species, boating and sailing. In summer it is possible to catch marlin, sailfish, dorado (mahi-mahi) and tuna. In front of the shoreline is Isla Tiburón, which is a declared ecological zone and is inhabited by wild sheep and deer. Kino Bay is the home of the Seri Museum, which was founded to preserve the Seri language and culture. State and federal officials are looking to develop Kino Bay into a major tourist resort, called a Zona turística prioritaria (Priority Tourism Zone). This would include government investment and the attraction of private investment through tax breaks.

The site is important because of its caves, which were used as dwellings, burial spaces and religious centers. The caves shelter paintings that contain numerous animals such as deer, birds and lizards as well as human figures. The human figures are stylized and some appear to be adorned with skins and/or horns, other are throwing spears and some appear to be dancing, wearing body paint. In addition there are geometric figures such as squares, triangles, circles, straight and wavy lines, all of which combine in one way or another to form complicated designs. In some areas of the caves there is evidence of paintings on top of paintings, testifying to the length of time the area was inhabited. The paintings have been attributed to the Comca'ac or Seri culture.

San Carlos is a beachfront subdivision within the port city of Guaymas, in the northern state of Sonora in Mexico. It is noted for the exceptional clarity and warmth of the ocean water in its shallow bays. It lies on the body of water known as the Gulf of California. Given the size of the city, with nearly 7,000 inhabitants, there is a remarkable number of RV parks, resorts and stores. There is also a very large and active diving community. There are also other outdoors activities like climbing, sailing, horseback riding, aquatic sports.

 Tourism 
 City center 

 Plaza Zaragoza 

Plaza Zaragoza was built in 1780, and was previously known as Plaza principal. The street that is located on the east side was named after General Ignacio Comonfort, moderate liberal and former president of the Republic. The four streets located around the plaza are among the oldest structures in the city.

 Cathedral 
The Hermosillo Cathedral, also called La Catedral de la Asunción, is one of the most visited places in the city. Its architectural style could be classified as baroque, neoclassical and neo-Gothic. It is 30 meters tall.

 Sonora Museum of Art (MUSAS) 
The Sonora Museum of Art, MUSAS, is a space dedicated to the dissemination and promotion of art and culture. The museum building has 5 thousand square meters of construction divided into four levels. It has large areas of circulation, internal courtyards, space for services, warehouses, workshops, offices, and various areas.

Some of the exhibitions that have been presented are:
 Art and body. Museum collection, Rufino Tamayo.
 Moments. Gustavo Ozuna
 The strange journey of time. Miguel Angel Ojeda.
 Holy Chaos. Andrés Gamiochipi.

 North zone 

 Cerro El Bachoco 
El Bachoco is a elevation of 610 meters and it is located north of the city. It is the favorite meeting point to practice mountain biking and hiking. This hill allows a short but demanding ascent, ideal for an evening walk. Access is at the junction of Morelos and Juan Bautista de Escalante boulevards (it is the highest point in Hermosillo).

 Sonora Stadium 
The Sonora Stadium is located in the city of Hermosillo, Sonora, Mexico. It is the new home of the Naranjeros de Hermosillo, team of the Mexican Pacific League that has 16 LMP Championships (most league winner), 3 Leagues of the Coast, 1 Northern League of Sonora, 1 National Winter Series, 1 Costa Rican Winter Championship and 2 Caribbean Series.

 Estadio Héctor Espino 
The Héctor Espino Stadium is located in the city of Hermosillo, Sonora, Mexico. It was the home of the Naranjeros de Hermosillo, team of the Mexican Pacific League until the 2012–13 season, which was supplied by the Sonora Stadium from the 2013–14 campaign. It also hosted the Cimarrones de Sonora football team, team of the Mexican Ascent League.

 City outskirts 
 San Pedro el Saucito 
The area of San Pedro o el Saucito (San Pedro el Saucito) is situated in the Municipality of Hermosillo (in the state of Sonora). There are 2,938 inhabitants. San Pedro o el Saucito (San Pedro el Saucito) has an altitude of 250m.

 Bahía de Kino 
The beach is named in honor of Eusebio Francisco Kino, who visited the site during his mission work in the 17th century. An indigenous people called the Seri had lived here long before that. A group of fishermen landed on the beach in 1930 and founded what is now known as Kino Viejo.

 Museo Étnico de los Seris 
The ethnic group known as the Seri call themselves "Comcaac," meaning "the People". They are now the least numerous indigenous group in Sonora.

This museum dedicated to the Seri was created with the objective of understanding and disseminating knowledge of
their history, political and social organization, language, demography, clothing, architecture, crafts, festivities, etc.

 Tiburon Island 

Shark Island, the largest in the Republic, was inhabited by the Seris, who attributed to the place a high religious significance.

Although at first glance the island does not seem more than a heavy rock in the middle of the sea, it has interesting natural attractions, such as the Sierras La Menor and Kunkaak, which cross it in almost its entire length to end both in the Tecomate Valley, which is Of stunning beauty.

A large number of terrestrial plant species and some 63 marine plant species have been identified on the island.

As for the animal species, about 205 sea and land birds, 31 reptile and amphibian species and a huge number of fish that inhabit the coast of the island have been registered.

 Temporary 

 Expogán 
It is based in the city of Hermosillo during the months of April and May on the Blvd. de los Ganaderos S / N. Col. Parque Industrial, CP 83297.

The Sound Expogan is a family event and has activities and attractions for the whole family, from popular games to popular dances. Each year the exhibition presents a large billboard of artists in its palenque, the most anticipated forum for inhabitants of the region and its visitors to the fair.[citation needed]

Some artists who have performed are:
 Juan Gabriel
 Vicente Fernández
 Joan Sebastian
 Pepe Aguilar
 Marco Antonio Solis
 Napoleón

 Hermosillo Racecourse 
The initial project begins as a race circuit for ¼ mile cars in Hermosillo, Sonora, it is then that a group of people who at that time participated in horse races invite managers of this company to support them through the construction and adaptation of a track or lane for horse racing within the same facilities, an invitation that is well received and achieved through the support of these people, is then that in the autumn of 1983 a new cycle begins in this company.

 Transportation 

General Ignacio Pesqueira García International Airport is located in the western area of the city. It has mostly domestic flights to Mexico City, Guadalajara, Tijuana and Monterrey, and has direct international flights to Phoenix. It has about 1.2 million passengers annually.

The city has a public transport system concessioned to private hands by the Government of the State of Sonora, which make up the trading company called SICTUHSA, which has a fleet of approximately 350 buses on 19 lines that cover much of the city . Although the most commonly used means of transport is car. The Federal Highway 15 connects Hermosillo with Nogales on a three-hour journey and Culiacán on an eight-hour journey.[citation needed'']

Twin towns and Sister cities
 Phoenix, Arizona, United States
 Irvine, California, United States
 Norwalk, California, United States
 Torreón, Coahuila, Mexico
 Riyadh, Saudi Arabia

Notable people from Hermosillo

 Bill Melendez (1916-2008) Mexican-born American animator and director of Peanuts specials
 Manuel Ignacio Acosta Gutiérrez (born 1977), politician and member of the Institutional Revolutionary Party
 Rafael Amaya (born 1977), actor
 Elsa Benítez (born 1977), model and television presenter
 Ignacio Bonillas (18581942), Mexican diplomat
 Cesar Rosas, (born 1954), singer and composer
 Pancho Búrquez (born 1958), politician
 Cajemé (José María Bonifacio Leyba Pérez, 18351887), prominent Yaqui military leader
 Marciano Cantero (born 1960), Argentine Mexican singer and musician, leader of Enanitos Verdes; originally from Mendoza, Argentina, currently based in Hermosillo
 Luis Alejandro Capdevielle Flores (born 1953), editor and politician
 Fernanda Castillo (María Fernanda Castillo), born 1982), actress
 Ramón Corral Ávila (born 1946), lawyer and politician, member of the National Action Party
 David L. Crawford (David Livingston Crawford, 18891974), Mexican American entomologist, coach of football and basketball, and college professor and administrator; originally from Hermosillo, lived until his death in Moorestown Township, New Jersey, in the United States
 El Dasa (Dasahev López Saavedra, born 1989), singer
 Gustavo Egelhaaf (born 1983), actor
 Emmanuel Espinosa (born 1975), Contemporary Christian musician, singer and songwriter, founder and bassist of Christian rock band Rojo
Luis Fernando González Hoenig (born 1995), baseball outfielder for the San Francisco Giants
 Manuel Uruchurtu Ramírez (1872-1912), lawyer, senator (1910-1912), lost his life in the sinking of RMS Titanic
 Isaac Paredes (born 1999), professional baseball player for the Tampa Bay Rays.

See also

 Northeast Hermosillo
 List of radio stations in Hermosillo

References

External links

Hermosillo official website (in Spanish)

 

Capitals of states of Mexico
Populated places established in 1700
Populated places in the Sonoran Desert of Mexico
1700 establishments in New Spain